The War of 1812 museum is a museum in Plattsburgh, New York dedicated to exploring the causes and effects of the War of 1812 and the Battle of Plattsburgh. The museum is run by the Battle of Plattsburgh Association.

The building has an Interpretive Center that features artifacts and graphic panels centered on a diorama depicting the battle. It also contains an exhibition area with rotating exhibits about the War of 1812. The museum hosts the Key Bank Gallery, which contains the paintings "Close Action" by Dean Mosher, and "Battle of Lake Champlain" by Julian Oliver Davidson. The museum is the caretaker of the original bronze plaques from the "Soldiers and Sailors Monument" on nearby Crab Island which are also on display in the gallery and were re-dedicated there in 2006. Group tours are available by appointment.  A History Shop sells War of 1812 related items.

References

External links

Museums of the War of 1812
History museums in New York (state)
Military and war museums in New York (state)
Museums in Clinton County, New York